Sun Valley National High School or SVNHS (formerly known as Dr. Arcadio Santos National High School - Sun Valley Annex) (Filipino: Mataas na Paaralang Pambansa ng Sun Valley) is a public national high school in Parañaque, located at Elizabeth Ave., Sta. Ana Drive, Brgy. Sun Valley.  It is under the administration of the local government of Parañaque City and is recognized by the Department of Education.   It offers public education for the residents of Brgy. Sun Valley as well as for those living near it.  The current principal/officer-in-charge is Dr. Leonisa D. Romano, Secondary School Principal I.  At present, it has approximately 2, 222 students from Grade 7 to Grade 10

History 
Sun Valley National High School is one of the public schools of Parañaque City.

It was an annex of Dr. Arcadio Santos National High School for two years (SY 2008-2010).

The building was built last August 2007 with an actual cost of thirty four million eight hundred four thousand three hundred two pesos and thirty-four centavos (P34, 804,302.34) funded by the City Government of Parañaque.

The school has four-storey building with 34 classrooms and 5 administrative rooms. Its lot area is 2990 m² with a floor area of 2736 m².

The school began its operation last June 10, 2008 offering five sections with a population of 267 students consisting of 159 males and 108 females. Initially, nine teachers from Dr. Arcadio Santos National High School were detailed here.

The school requested non-teaching staff from the office of the mayor and the City Government reassigned two non-teaching staff to the school. One is a Security Agent 1 from PSSD-CSU and an Administrative Aide I from F. Serrano Elementary School.

Last 2009, through the help of ASUS Foundation with partners Commission on Information & Communications Technology (CICT) and Institute for Information Industry (III), 21 sets of desktop computers were added to the computer laboratory called ADOC 2.0 e-Learning Digital Center.  It was initiated by the Chinese Taipei of Asia-Pacific Economic Corporation (APEC). The 9th Council of Barangay Sun Valley supported also by donating and installing electrical wires in each unit.

March 2010, the school became one of the independent high schools of the city by the virtue of the Republic Act 10065 authored by the former Congressman Roilo S. Golez of District II.

June 2010, the school and the Sun Valley Council joined forces in establishing the Science Laboratory located at the 4th floor of the building.

School year 2011-2012, Sun Valley National High School had composed 10 sections in the first year level, 8 in the second year, 6 in the third year and 4 sections in the fourth year level with the total population of 1,750 students, 43 teachers and 11 non-teaching staff.

Sun Valley National High school was also a recipient of CONG. ROILO GOLEZ’ Project Golezeum. The said project provided a see-through roof to cover the school ground.

In June 2011, the school has the new officer-in-charge who was a Filipino Supervisor, MARIETTA M. SANTOS+. During her term, landscape was enhanced beside the flagpole. Different offices were also structured.

In May 2012 before the school year opened, the school received its new officer in charge in the person of MR. CARLITO T. ADDUCUL. He was an Assistant to the Principal of Parañaque National High School-Main for many years and was an OIC-Principal of Parañaque National High School - Don Galo before taking over Sun Valley National High School. During the school year 2012-2013, it was the big leap of enrollment. Approximately 400 students were added. From 1,750 enrollees, it jumped to more than 2,000. With the big enrollment, the school implemented the two shifts scheme for the first time. Morning session from 6:00 AM to 1:20 PM and 1:20 PM to 6:00 PM for the afternoon session. With this big population, the school had added four national permanent teachers and six LSB teachers.

The Alternative Learning System (ALS) was enhanced and the Open High School Program (OHSP) was initiated.

The canteen and its services were improved for the convenience of the students.

On September 2, 2013, the school acknowledged new officer-in-charge in the person of Leonisa D. Romano. She was a member of the faculty of Parañaque National High School-Main. Then and up to the present, she is highly motivated to render her prowess in managing and developing the school.

Sun Valley National High School ranked 3rd over-all as the best school for providing quality education to high school students in the Division of Paranaque. It  scored a 63.62% average on the National Achievement Test for the school year 2013-2014. The school was awarded as the Center of Excellence in Secondary Education in Science  by the City Schools Division of Parañaque.

Principals 

 Mrs. Thelma Montiel
(2008 - 2011)
 Mrs. Marietta Santos (deceased)
(2011 - 2012)
 Mr. Carlito Adducul
(2012 - 2013)
 Dr. Leonisa D. Romano
(2013 up to present)

Subject Coordinators 

Filipino
 Ms. Ermelita Peñalosa 
English 
 Mrs. Luzviminda Pahoyo
Mathematics
 Ms. Heny Consumo
Science
 Mr. Ricky Refre
Araling Panlipunan
 Mrs. Eliza Joson
TLE
 Mrs. Marilyn Inocencio
MAPEH
 Mrs. Emilia Saladino
EP
 Mrs. Flerida Tabuena
OHSP
 Mr. Danilo Dineros
AM Session & ICT
 Mr. Angelo Armas
PM Session
 Mr. Lio Guevara

SVNHS Hymn 
I.
O, Alma Mater kong mahal
Ikaw ang gabay ko't ilaw
Kami' iyong mga anak
Ay patuloy na magagalak
Katapatan at tagumpay
Sa iyo'y aming iaalay

II.
Ang mga aral mo't layunin
Hinding hindi iwawaglit
Taas noong magpupugay
Sa ngalan mo, Alma Mater ko
Mataas na Paaralang Sun Valley
Alma Mater naming mahal

See also 
 List of schools in Parañaque

References 

Schools in Parañaque
High schools in Metro Manila